The San Gabriel Mountains are a mountain range located in northern Los Angeles County and western San Bernardino County, California, United States. The mountain range is part of the Transverse Ranges and lies between the Los Angeles Basin and the Mojave Desert, with Interstate 5 to the west and Interstate 15 to the east. The range lies in, and is surrounded by, the Angeles and San Bernardino National Forests, with the San Andreas Fault as its northern border.

The highest peak in the range is Mount San Antonio, commonly referred to as Mt. Baldy. Mount Wilson is another notable peak, known for the Mount Wilson Observatory and the antenna farm that houses many of the transmitters for local media. The observatory may be visited by the public. On October 10, 2014, President Obama designated the area the San Gabriel Mountains National Monument.

Geography

Much of the range features rolling peaks. The range lacks craggy features, but contains a large number of canyons and is generally very rugged and difficult to traverse. The San Gabriel Mountains are a large fault block that was uplifted and then dissected by numerous rivers and washes.

Setting and elevation

Pacoima and Big Tujunga Canyons cut through the range just east of San Fernando, carrying runoff into the San Fernando Valley. Little Tujunga Canyon Road bridges the range in this area, connecting the San Fernando Valley to the Santa Clara River valley in the north.

On the north the range is abruptly dissected by the canyon of the West Fork San Gabriel River.

On the north slopes of the San Gabriel crest, the northern ranks of mountains drop down incrementally to the floor of the Mojave Desert in a much more gradual manner than the sheer southern flank. The Angeles Crest Highway, one of the main routes across the San Gabriels, runs through this area from west to east. Little Rock, Big Rock, and Sheep Creeks drain off the northern part of the mountains, forming large alluvial fans as they descend into the Mojave. To the east, the San Andreas Fault cuts across the range, forming a series of long, straight, and narrow depressions, including Swarthout Valley and Lone Pine Canyon. South of Mount San Antonio, San Antonio Creek drains the mountains, cutting the deep San Antonio Canyon.

East of San Antonio Canyon, the range gradually loses elevation, and the highest peaks in this section of the mountain range are in the south, rising dramatically above the cities of Claremont, Upland and Rancho Cucamonga. Lytle Creek, flowing generally southeast, drains most of the extreme eastern San Gabriels. The range terminates at Cajon Pass, through which runs Interstate 15, and beyond which rise the even higher San Bernardino Mountains.

Locale
The Range is bounded on the north by the Antelope Valley and the Mojave Desert and to the south by the communities of Greater Los Angeles. The south side of the range is almost continuously urbanized and includes the Los Angeles city communities of Sylmar, Pacoima, and Sunland-Tujunga, as well as cities and unincorporated areas of San Fernando, La Crescenta, La Cañada Flintridge, Altadena, Pasadena, Sierra Madre, Arcadia, Monrovia, Bradbury, Duarte, Azusa, Glendora, San Dimas, La Verne, Claremont, Upland, Rancho Cucamonga, Fontana, and Rialto. The north side of the range is less densely populated and includes the city of Palmdale as well as the small unincorporated towns of Acton, Littlerock, Pearblossom, Valyermo, Llano, Piñon Hills, and Phelan. At the west end of the range lies the city of Santa Clarita. Within the mountains themselves are the small unincorporated communities of Mount Baldy, Wrightwood, Big Pines and Lytle Creek.

Hydrology
Melting snow and rain runoff on the south side of the San Gabriels' highest mountains give rise to its largest river, the San Gabriel River. Just to the west of Mount Hawkins, a north-south divide separates water running down the two main forks of the river and their tributaries. The two meet at San Gabriel Reservoir, and turn south, boring through the southern portion of the San Gabriels, emptying of the mountains near Azusa into the urban San Gabriel Valley, and eventually to the Pacific Ocean near Seal Beach.

Peaks

San Gabriel Mountains peaks within the Angeles National Forest include:
 Mount San Antonio (Mount Baldy), 
 Pine Mountain, 
 Dawson Peak, 
 Mount Harwood, 
 Mount Baden-Powell, 
 Throop Peak, 
 Mount Burnham, 
 Telegraph Peak, 
 Cucamonga Peak, 
 Ontario Peak, 
 Mount Lewis, 
 Timber Mountain, 
 Mount Islip,  — site of historic Mt. Islip fire lookout tower 
 Mount Williamson, 
 Waterman Mountain, 
 Iron Mountain, 
 South Mount Hawkins,  — lookout destroyed in Curve Fire, 2002
 Pacifico Mountain, 
 Mount Gleason, 
 Strawberry Peak, 
 San Gabriel Peak, 
 Mount Disappointment, 
 Vetter Mountain,  — site of historic Vetter Mountain Fire lookout tower
 Rattlesnake Peak, 
 Mount Wilson,  — location of the Mount Wilson Observatory
 Mount Lowe,  — site of Mount Lowe Railway
 Condor Peak, 
 Monrovia Peak, 
 Rankin Peak, 
 Smith Mountain, 
 Mount Lukens, 
 Magic Mountain,  
 Mendenhall Peak, 
 Clamshell Peak, 
 Los Piñetos Peak 
 Kagel Mountain, 
 Potato Mountain, 
 Echo Mountain,

Climate

The climate of the range varies with elevation from continental to the Mediterranean, with mostly dry summers (except for scattered summer thunderstorms) and cold, wet winters. Snow can fall above  elevation during frontal passages between November and April, but is most common in December through March.

The coastal (south) side of the range receives more precipitation than the desert (northern) side. The highest precipitation is found in the central and eastern parts of the range (Mt. Wilson to Mt. San Antonio). Runoff from the mountains during big storms often produces flooding in adjacent foothill communities (especially in areas denuded by wildfires). The range is mostly smog-free above  elevation, above the inversion layer. The large telescope installation at Mt. Wilson is a testimony to the clear atmospheric conditions that prevail, although light pollution from the L.A. basin below has hindered telescope activities in recent decades.

Wildfires 
The San Gabriel Mountains see wildfires frequently. The fires are often driven by dry Santa Ana wind events in the summer and fall. Notable wildfires in the San Gabriel Mountains have included the 2009 Station Fire and the 2020 Bobcat Fire.

Geology
Granitic and metasedimentary rocks are the primary constituent of the San Gabriel Mountains. Metasedimentary rocks were attached to the North American craton in the Precambrian eon, and granitic rocks formed throughout the Mesozoic as oceanic plates subducted underneath the North American west coast. Like nearly all of the other mountains in the Transverse Ranges, the San Gabriels are a series of fault blocks that were uplifted in the Cenozoic. Tectonic uplift rates and erosion rates systematically increase as topography steepens eastward in the San Gabriel Mountains, where the San Andreas and San Jacinto faults meet.

Current rates of erosion in the eastern San Gabriel mountains are among the fastest in the continental United States and have accelerated in response to the increased frequency of wildfires over the 1900s.  Over future centuries, it remains unclear whether soil and brush ecosystems in the San Gabriel mountains will continue to re-establish soil and vegetation after increasing fire and soil-erosion frequencies, or if increasing fire frequencies and erosion will strip soils and permanently alter soil cover and vegetation types across the mountain ecosystem.

Ecology
There are both areas of conifer as well as broadleaf forestation, including the presence of some endemic taxa. Conifer (pine, fir, cedar) and oak forests are most widespread above  where the precipitation is above  (the central and eastern high San Gabriels). In the wetter areas, madrone and bay laurel trees also occur in places, and ferns are common. Trees like willow, alder, and cottonwood are also found throughout the range along with the stream courses (riparian habitat), even at lower elevations. Chaparral (dense shrub, brush, and small tree) vegetation is widespread where there is no continuous tall tree cover, especially at lower elevations. Chaparral is highly adapted to fire and replaces trees for decades after fires. There is a subspecies of the Leather Oak which is found only within the San Gabriel Mountains.  The Rift Zone along the San Andreas Fault produces numerous springs, sag ponds, and wetland areas that are critical habitats for a variety of native species.

Larger animals include California mule deer, California black bear, San Pedro Martir coyote and the rarely seen mountain lion or cougar. Smaller mammals include raccoons, opossum, skunk, and bobcats. Golden and bald eagles are found rarely, but hawks are common. Rattlesnakes are common and often encountered on trails by hikers. Critically endangered yellow-legged frogs have declined or vanished from the streams due to the loss of suitable habitat. The introduction of invasive predators like trout, which feed on tadpoles, decimated their population.

Transportation 

The main road that runs through the San Gabriel Mountains is the Angeles Crest Highway, State Route 2. It starts in the southwest at the city of La Cañada Flintridge and ends at its junction with State Route 138, just past Wrightwood, near the Victor Valley and the western Cajon Valley. Past its junction with Angeles Forest Highway, traveling east, Angeles Crest Highway features blind curves, various bumps, and potholes. This section of the "Crest" is closed during the winter due to rockfall and avalanche hazards. State Route 2, just past Mountain High, is called the Big Pines Highway to the Route 138 junction.

Another key county route through, the mountains is Angeles Forest Highway. Angeles Forest Highway begins 11 miles northeast of La Cañada Flintridge at its Angeles Crest Highway junction. Ending near Acton, it allows easy access to the central Forest and the fast-growing Antelope Valley. Because the "Forest" and the  "Crest" portion leading to La Cañada Flintridge is well-traveled by Antelope Valley commuters, its road maintenance is much better, and it is open much of the winter.

State Route 39 connected the city of Azusa with the Angeles Crest Highway until it was seriously damaged by landslides, first in 1978, and again in 2005. The highway was opened to emergency crews in February 2003.

People heading to Mount Waterman must now travel west to Pasadena and then travel on the Angeles Crest Highway (Highway 2) in La Cañada Flintridge, a nearly two-hour trip. Reopening Highway 39 would cut the drive-time to the Waterman Ski Area in half and shorten the trip east to Wrightwood.

According to the Caltrans District Seven "Inside Seven" Newsletter, "Two projects that will address those issues and get the highway reopened are scheduled for construction soon. The second, a $45 million project to reconstruct the roadway, construct soldier pile retaining walls, repair drainage systems, install rockfall protection, and provide asphalt concrete overlay and traffic striping, should begin in fall 2010."

In 2011, the planned repair of the road was abruptly terminated, due to concern of high future maintenance costs, and potential impact on the local bighorn sheep population. However, in October 2016, Caltrans announced it was again considering plans to re-open the road, after pressure from local communities.

Recreation
In the winter, snowboarding and skiing are quite popular in the San Gabriels, at Mountain High and Mt. Baldy. The two other resorts, Mount Waterman and Kratka Ridge, are rarely open due to insufficient snow. In the summer, canyoneering, hiking, backpacking, picnicking, and camping are some of the activities popular with visitors. From time to time, a hiker gets lost or stuck on a mountain ledge or may fall downhill. Some of the more extreme cases of emergency search-and-rescue efforts will often be given air time on Los Angeles television and radio newscasts. The Pacific Crest Trail passes along the mountain ridge.

During the winter, many Southern California mountaineers climb a variety of snow routes and even some ice routes in the San Gabriel Mountains. Baldy Bowl is by far the most popular route, getting hundreds of climbers per season. There are many other routes, offering a variety of choices.

Rock climbing is not as common in the San Gabriel Range as it is in neighboring areas, as this range is famous for loose rock. Various faults crisscross the range, making it one of the steepest and fastest-growing ranges in the world. Plate tectonic activity breaks up most rock, making it unsuitable for rock climbing. Williamson Rock was the most famous climbing area until it was closed for climbing. There are many other craggy areas scattered about the range that provide mostly traditional climbing opportunities.

Angeles National Forest Fire Lookout Association has rebuilt and operates Vetter Mountain Lookout, and Slide Mountain Lookout. The organization is rebuilding South Mount Hawkins Lookout.

Nearby ranges
San Rafael Hills
Santa Ana Mountains
Verdugo Mountains
San Bernardino Mountains
Santa Susana Mountains
Santa Monica Mountains
Sierra Pelona Mountains
Topatopa Mountains
Tehachapi Mountains

Gallery

References

External links

Outdoor LA Hiking Trails – Hiking trails in the area with maps and directions to the trailheads.
Geographic, Biological, and Geological information

 
Transverse Ranges
Mountain ranges of Los Angeles County, California
Mountain ranges of San Bernardino County, California
Mountain ranges of the Mojave Desert
Angeles National Forest
 Mountain ranges of Southern California